Vlado Gaćinović may refer to:

Vladimir Gaćinović (1890–1917), Bosnian Serb essayist and revolutionary
Vladimir Gaćinović (footballer) (born 1966), Serbian football manager and former player